The Cajon Valley Beds is a sedimentary geologic formation in the El Cajon Valley of southwestern San Diego County, California.

It preserves fossils dating back to the Neogene period of the Cenozoic Era.

See also

 
 List of fossiliferous stratigraphic units in California
 Paleontology in California

References

Neogene California
Geology of San Diego County, California
El Cajon, California
Geologic formations of California